The men's slalom competition of the 2022 Winter Paralympics was held at the Yanqing National Alpine Skiing Centre in Beijing on 13 March 2022.

Medal table

Visually impaired
In the slalom visually impaired, the athlete with a visual impairment has a sighted guide. The two skiers are considered a team, and dual medals are awarded.

Standing

Sitting

See also
Alpine skiing at the 2022 Winter Olympics

References

Men's slalom